Glyphoturris rugirima is a species of sea snail, a marine gastropod mollusc in the family Mangeliidae.

Description
The length of the shell varies between 5 mm and 8 mm.

This species differs from Glyphoturris diminuta in being smaller and shorter proportionally, and with the strength of the sculpture even more exaggerated.

Distribution
G. rugirima can be found in Atlantic waters, ranging from the eastern coast of Florida south to Brazil and surrounding Bermuda.; in the Gulf of Mexico and the Caribbean Sea.

References

 Rosenberg, G., F. Moretzsohn, and E. F. García. 2009. Gastropoda (Mollusca) of the Gulf of Mexico, Pp. 579–699 in Felder, D.L. and D.K. Camp (eds.), Gulf of Mexico–Origins, Waters, and Biota. Biodiversity. Texas A&M Press, College Station, Texas

External links
 
  Tucker, J.K. 2004 Catalog of recent and fossil turrids (Mollusca: Gastropoda). Zootaxa 682:1–1295.
 Specimen at MNHN, Paris

rugirima
Gastropods described in 1889